Mount Mitchell is a mountain located in Skamania County in Washington state. On a clear day the summit provides excellent views of four of the Cascade's most massive volcanoes: Mount Rainier, Mount Adams, Mount Hood and Mount St. Helens, which rises  to the north.

References

External links 
 
 

Mountains of Washington (state)
Mountains of Skamania County, Washington